Frank H. "Wick" Wickhorst (March 18, 1905 – September 13, 1972) was an American football player and coach.  He played college football as a tackle at the United States Naval Academy and was selected as an All-American in 1926.  Wickhorst served as the head football coach at the University of California, Berkeley in 1946, compiling a record of 2–7.  He was inducted into the College Football Hall of Fame as a player in 1970.

Head coaching record

References

External links
 

1905 births
1972 deaths
American football tackles
California Golden Bears football coaches
Navy Midshipmen football players
All-American college football players
College Football Hall of Fame inductees
United States Navy officers
United States Navy personnel of World War II
Sportspeople from Aurora, Illinois
Coaches of American football from Illinois
Players of American football from Illinois
Military personnel from Illinois